Kitigan Zibi Anishinabeg is an Algonquin First Nation in Quebec, Canada. It is based in the Outaouais region and owns one Indian reserve named Kitigan Zibi, located on the shores of the Gatineau River near Maniwaki. In 2018, it has a total registered population of 3,286 members.

Politics
The Kitigan Zibi Anishinabeg are governed by a band council elected according to an election system based on Section 11 of the Indian Act. For 2020-2022 tenure, the chief of this council is Dylan Whiteduck.

Languages
According to Statistics Canada's 2011 Census, on a total population of 1,395, 36.2% knew an indigenous language. More precisely, 25.4% had an indigenous language still spoken and understood as first language and 21.1% spoke an indigenous language at home. Regarding Canada's two official languages, 43% knew both English and French, 54.8% knew only English and 2.1% knew only French. Concerned about the disinterest of its youth in their own language, the community has decided to reintroduce the teaching of the Algonquin language in school.

As of the 2016 census of those living on the Kitigan Zibi reserve:
 20.7% learned their indigenous language as their first language.
 17.4% spoke an indigenous language at home.
 31% had knowledge of an indigenous language.
 59.5% spoke only English out of the official languages.
 2.4% spoke only French out of the official languages.
 37.6% spoke both English and French.

List of chiefs
The chiefs have been:
 Chief Antoine Pakinawatik - 1854-1874
 Chief Peter Tenasco - 1874-1884, 1890–1896
 Chief Simon Odjick - 1884-1890
 Chief Louizon Commanda - 1896-1899
 Chief John Tenasco - 1899-1911
 Chief Michael Commanda - 1911-1917
 Chief John Cayer - 1917-1920
 Chief John B. Chabot - 1920-1924, 1939–1951
 Chief Vincent Odjick - 1927-1933
 Chief Patrick Brascoupe - 1933-1936
 Chief Abraham McDougall - 1936-1939
 Chief William Commanda - 1951-1970
 Chief Ernest McGregor - 1970-1976
 Chief Jean Guy Whiteduck - 1976-2006
 Chief Stephen McGregor - 2006-2008
 Chief Gilbert Whiteduck - 2008-2015
 Chief Jean-Guy Whiteduck - 2015–2020
 Chief Dylan Whiteduck - 2020-Present

Culture and tourism
The Kitigan Zibi Pow wow is held annually on the first weekend of June. The Kitigan Zibi Cultural Centre has a number of exhibits, cultural artifacts, paintings, and photographs relating to the Algonquin culture and history. A living museum, Mawandoseg Kitigan Zibi, is dedicated to the Anishinaabeg way of life.

Notable members 
 Nadia Myre, interdisciplinary artist

References

External links
 Kitigan Zibi Anishinabeg community home page
 First Nation Detail by Indigenous and Northern Affairs Canada

Algonquin
Anishinaabe groups
First Nations governments in Quebec